Ray Young may refer to:

 Ray Young (executive) (born 1962), chief financial officer of Archer Daniels Midland Company
 Ray Young (politician) (1938–2000), member of the Western Australian Legislative Assembly
 W. Rae Young (1915–2008), Bell Labs engineer, co-inventor of the cell phone
 Ray Young (baseball), former Stanford Cardinal baseball coach
 Ray Young (actor) (1940–1999), American actor known from Genesis II, Chapter Two or Return of the Beverly Hillbillies